The Asheville Daily Planet is a free independent alternative newspaper published in Asheville, North Carolina.  It was named after the fictional newspaper Daily Planet in the Superman universe.

In spite of its name, it is not, and never has been, a daily paper. It began publishing as a weekly on December 1, 2004. Due to economic conditions, it began publishing monthly in July 2008.

See also
 Twin Cities Daily Planet
 Daily Planet (Philadelphia newspaper)
 Berkeley Daily Planet
 Daily Planet DC
 Telluride Daily Planet

Footnotes

External links
 Asheville Daily Planet website.

Newspapers published in North Carolina
Mass media in Asheville, North Carolina